Ancient Macedonian, the language of the ancient Macedonians, either a dialect of Ancient Greek, or a separate Hellenic language, was spoken in the kingdom of Macedonia during the 1st millennium BC and belongs to the Indo-European language family. It gradually fell out of use during the 4th century BC, marginalized by the use of Attic Greek by the Macedonian aristocracy, the Ancient Greek dialect that became the basis of Koine Greek, the lingua franca of the Hellenistic period. It became extinct during either the Hellenistic or Roman imperial period, and was entirely replaced by Koine Greek.

While the bulk of surviving public and private inscriptions found in ancient Macedonia were written in Attic Greek (and later in Koine Greek), fragmentary documentation of a vernacular local variety comes from onomastic evidence, ancient glossaries and recent epigraphic discoveries in the Greek region of Macedonia, such as the Pella curse tablet. This local variety is usually classified by scholars as a dialect of Northwest Doric Greek, and occasionally as an Aeolic Greek dialect or a distinct sister language of Greek.

Classification 
Due to the fragmentary attestation of this dialect or language, various interpretations are possible. Suggested classifications of ancient Macedonian include:

A Greek dialect related to, or a version of, Aeolic Greek; suggested by August Fick (1874), Otto Hoffmann (1906), N. G. L. Hammond (1997) and Ian Worthington (2012).

A sister language of Greek, according to a scheme in which Macedonian and Greek are the two branches of a Greco-Macedonian subgroup (sometimes called "Hellenic"); suggested by Georgiev (1966), Joseph (2001) and Hamp (2013).

Properties 
Because of the fragmentary sources of Ancient Macedonian, only a little is understood about the special features of the language. A notable sound-law is that the Proto-Indo-European voiced aspirates (/bʰ, dʰ, gʰ/) sometimes appear as voiced stops /b, d, g/, (written ), whereas they were generally unvoiced as /pʰ, tʰ, kʰ/ elsewhere in Ancient Greek.
Macedonian  dánοs ('death', from PIE  'to leave'), compared to Attic  
Macedonian  abroûtes or  abroûwes, compared to Attic   for 'eyebrows'
Macedonian  Bereníkē, compared to Attic  , 'bearing victory' (Personal name)
Macedonian  adraia ('bright weather'), compared to Attic  , from PIE 
Macedonian  báskioi ('fasces'), compared to Attic   'leather sack', from PIE 
According to Herodotus 7.73 (c. 440 BC), the Macedonians claimed that the Phryges were called Bryges before they migrated from Thrace to Anatolia (around 8th–7th century BC).
According to Plutarch, Moralia Macedonians use 'b' instead of 'ph', while Delphians use 'b' in the place of 'p'.
Macedonian  mágeiros ('butcher') was a loan from Doric into Attic.

If  gotán ('pig') is related to *gwou ('cattle'), this would indicate that the labiovelars were either intact, or merged with the velars, unlike the usual Greek treatment (Attic  ). Such deviations, however, are not unknown in Greek dialects; compare Laconian Doric (the dialect of Sparta)   for common Greek  , as well as Doric   and Ionic   for common Greek  .

In Aristophanes' The Birds, the form   ('red head', the name of a bird, perhaps the goldfinch or redpoll) is found, showing a Macedonian-style voiced stop in place of a standard Greek unvoiced aspirate:   versus   ('head'). Emilio Crespo wrote that "the voicing of voiceless stops and the development of aspirates into voiced fricatives turns out to be the outcome of an internal development of Macedonian as a dialect of Greek" without excluding "the presence of interference from other languages or of any linguistic substrate or adstrate", as also argued by M. Hatzopoulos.

A number of the Macedonian words, particularly in Hesychius of Alexandria' lexicon, are disputed (i.e., some do not consider them actual Macedonian words) and some may have been corrupted in the transmission. If so, this word would perhaps be encompassable within a Greek dialect; however, others (e.g. A. Meillet) see the dental as authentic and think that this specific word would perhaps belong to an Indo-European language different from Greek.

A. Panayotou summarizes some features generally identified through ancient texts and epigraphy:

Phonology
Occasional development of voiced aspirates (*bh, *dh, *gh) into voiced stops (b, d, g) (e.g. Βερενίκα, Attic Φερενίκη)
Retention of */a:/ (e.g. Μαχάτας), also present in Epirotic
[a:] as a result of contraction between [a:] and [ɔ:]
Apocope of short vowels in prepositions in synthesis (Attic )
Syncope (hyphairesis) and diphthongization are used to avoid hiatus (e.g. , Attic ; compare with Epirotic , Doric ).
Occasional retention of the pronunciation [u] of /u(:)/ in local cult epithets or nicknames ( = )
Raising of /ɔ:/ to /u:/ in proximity to nasal (e.g. , Attic )
Simplification of the sequence /ign/ to /i:n/ (γίνομαι, Attic )
Loss of aspiration of the consonant cluster /sth/ (> /st/) (Attic )

Morphology 
Ancient Macedonian morphology is shared with ancient Epirus, including some of the oldest inscriptions from Dodona. The morphology of the first declension nouns with an -ας ending is also shared with Thessalian (e.g. Epitaph for Pyrrhiadas, Kierion).
First-declension masculine and feminine in -ας and -α respectively (e.g.)
First-declension masculine genitive singular in -α (e.g. )
First-declension genitive plural in -ᾶν
First person personal pronoun dative singular 
Temporal conjunction 
Possibly, a non-sigmatic nominative masculine singular in the first declension (Attic )

Onomastics

Anthroponymy 

M. Hatzopoulos and Johannes Engels summarize the Macedonian anthroponymy (that is names borne by people from Macedonia before the expansion beyond the Axios or people undoubtedly hailing from this area after the expansion) as follows:

Epichoric (local) Greek names that either differ from the phonology of the introduced Attic or that remained almost confined to Macedonians throughout antiquity
Panhellenic (common) Greek names
Identifiable non-Greek (Thracian and Illyrian) names
Names without a clear Greek etymology that can't however be ascribed to any identifiable non-Greek linguistic group.

Common in the creation of ethnics is the use of -έστης, -εστός especially when derived from sigmatic nouns (ὄρος > Ὀρέστης but also Δῖον > Διασταί). 

Per Engels, the above material supports that Macedonian anthroponymy was predominantly Greek in character.

Toponymy 
The toponyms of Macedonia proper are generally Greek, though some of them show a particular phonology and a few others are non-Greek.

Calendar 

The Macedonian calendar's origins go back to Greek prehistory. The names of the Macedonian months, just like most of the names of Greek months, are derived from feasts and related celebrations in honor of the Greek gods. Most of them combine a Macedonian dialectal form with a clear Greek etymology (e.g Δῐός from Zeus; Περίτιος from Heracles Peritas (“Guardian”) ; Ξανδικός/Ξανθικός from Xanthos, “the blond” (probably a reference to Heracles); Άρτεμίσιος from Artemis etc.) with the possible exception of one, which is attested in other Greek calendars as well. According to Martin P. Nilsson, the Macedonian calendar is formed like a regular Greek one and the names of the months attest the Greek nationality of the Macedonians.

Epigraphy 
Macedonian onomastics: the earliest epigraphical documents attesting substantial numbers of Macedonian proper names are the second Athenian alliance decree with Perdiccas II (~417–413 BC), the decree of Kalindoia (~335–300 BC) and seven curse tablets of the 4th century BC bearing mostly names.

About 99% of the roughly 6,300 inscriptions discovered by archaeologists within the confines of ancient Macedonia were written in the Greek language, using the Greek alphabet. The legends in all currently discovered coins also in Greek. The Pella curse tablet, a text written in a distinct Doric Greek dialect, found in 1986 and dated to between mid to early 4th century BC, has been forwarded as an argument that the ancient Macedonian language was a dialect of North-Western Greek, part of the Doric dialect group.

Hesychius' glossary 

A body of idiomatic words has been assembled from ancient sources, mainly from coin inscriptions, and from the 5th century lexicon of Hesychius of Alexandria, amounting to about 150 words and 200 proper names, though the number of considered words sometimes differs from scholar to scholar. The majority of these words can be confidently assigned to Greek albeit some words would appear to reflect a dialectal form of Greek. There are, however, a number of words that are not easily identifiable as Greek and reveal, for example, voiced stops where Greek shows voiceless aspirates. 

 marked words which have been corrupted.

 abagna 'roses amaranta (unwithered)' (Attic  rhoda, Aeolic  broda roses). (LSJ: amarantos unfading. Amaranth flower. (Aeolic  aba 'youthful prime' +  hagnos 'pure, chaste, unsullied) or epithet aphagna from aphagnizo 'purify'. If abagnon is the proper name for rhodon rose, then it is cognate to Persian  , 'garden', Gothic   'tree' and Greek bakanon 'cabbage-seed'. Finally, a Phrygian borrowing is highly possible if we think of the famous Gardens of Midas, where roses grow of themselves (see Herodotus 8.138.2, Athenaeus 15.683)
 abarknai  (komai?  abarkna hunger, famine).
 abarú 'oregano' (Hes.  origanon) (LSJ:  barú perfume used in incense, Attic  barú 'heavy') (LSJ: amarakon sweet Origanum Majorana) (Hes. for origanon  agribrox,  abromon,  artiphos,  keblênê)
,  abloē, alogei Text Corrupted  spendô)
 or  abroûtes or abroûwes 'eyebrows' (Hes. Attic  ophrûs acc. pl.,  ophrúes nom., PIE *) (Serbian , Lithuanian , Persian  ) (Koine Greek ophrudia, Modern Greek  )
 ankalis Attic 'weight, burden, load' Macedonian 'sickle' (Hes. Attic  ákhthos,  drépanon, LSJ Attic  ankalís 'bundle', or in pl.  ankálai 'arms' (body parts),  ánkalos 'armful, bundle',  ankálē 'the bent arm' or 'anything closely enfolding', as the arms of the sea, PIE * 'to bend') ( ankylis 'barb' Oppianus.C.1.155.)
 addai poles of a chariot or car, logs (Attic ῥυμοὶ rhumoi) (Aeolic usdoi, Attic ozoi, branches, twigs) PIE , branch
 adē 'clear sky' or 'the upper air' (Hes.  ouranós 'sky', LSJ and Pokorny Attic  aithēr 'ether, the upper, purer air', hence 'clear sky, heaven')
 adiskon potion, cocktail (Attic kykeôn)
 adraia 'fine weather, open sky' (Hes. Attic  aithría, Epirotan , PIE *aidh-)
 Aeropes tribe (wind-faced) (aero- +opsis(aerops opos, Boeotian name for the bird merops)
 akontion spine or backbone, anything ridged like the backbone: ridge of a hill or mountain (Attic rhachis) (Attic akontion spear, javelin) (Aeolic akontion part of troops)
 akrea girl (Attic  korê, Ionic kourê, Doric/Aeolic kora, Arcadian korwa, Laconian kyrsanis (epithet of Aphrodite in Cyprus, instead of Akraia, of the heights). Epithet of a goddess from an archaic Corcyraic inscription.
 akrounoi 'boundary stones' nom. pl. (Hes.  hóroi, LSJ Attic  ákron 'at the end or extremity', from  akē 'point, edge', PIE * 'summit, point' or 'sharp')
 alíē 'boar or boarfish' (Attic kapros) (PIE */* "red, brown" (in animal and tree names) (Homeric ellos fawn, Attic elaphos 'deer', alkê elk)
 aliza (also alixa) 'White Poplar' (Attic  leúkē, Epirotan , Thessalian alphinia, LSJ: , aluza globularia alypum) (Pokorny Attic  elátē 'fir, spruce', PIE *, *, P.Gmc. and Span.  'alder')
 axos 'timber' (Hes. Attic  hulê) (Cretan Doric ausos Attic alsos 'grove' little forest. (PIE * ash tree (OE.  ash tree), (Greek οξυά oxya, Albanian , beech), (Armenian   ash tree)
 aortês, 'swordsman' (Hes. ξιφιστής; Homer  áor 'sword'; Attic  aortēr 'swordstrap', Modern Greek  aortír 'riflestrap'; hence aorta) (According to Suidas: Many now say the knapsack  abertê instead of aortê. Both the object and the word [are] Macedonian.
 Αrantides Erinyes (in dative  ) (Arae name for Erinyes, arasimos accursed, araomai invoke, curse, pray or rhantizô sprinkle, purify.
 argella 'bathing hut'. Cimmerian  or argila 'subterranean dwelling' (Ephorus in Strb. 5.4.5) PIE *; borrowed into Balkan Latin and gave Romanian  (pl. ), "wooden hut", dialectal (Banat)  "stud farm"); cf. Sanskrit  'latch, bolt', Old English  "building, house", Albanian  "harrow, crude bridge of crossbars, crude raft supported by skin bladders"
 argiopous 'eagle' (LSJ Attic  argípous 'swift- or white-footed', PIE * < PIE * + PIE *)
 Arētos epithet or alternative of Herakles (Ares-like)
 arkon 'leisure, idleness' (LSJ Attic  argós 'lazy, idle' nom. sing.,  acc.)
 arhphys (Attic ἱμάς himas strap, rope), (ἁρπεδών harpedôn cord, yarn; ἁρπεδόνα Rhodes, Lindos II 2.37).
 aspilos 'torrent' (Hes.  kheímarrhos, Attic  áspilos 'without stain, spotless, pure')
 babrên lees of olive-oil (LSJ:  babrêkes gums, or food in the teeth,  babuas mud)
 bathara pukliê (Macedonian), purlos (Athamanian) (unattested; maybe food, atharê porridge, pyros wheat)
 birrhox dense, thick (LSJ: βειρόν beiron)
  garka rod (Attic charax) (EM: garkon axle-pin) (LSJ: garrha rod)
 gola or goda bowels, intestines (Homeric cholades) PIE: ,  stomach; bowels
 gotan 'pig' acc. sing. (PIE * 'cattle', (Attic  botón ' beast', in plural  botá 'grazing animals') (Laconian grôna 'sow' female pig, and pl. grônades) (LSJ: goi, goi, to imitate the sound of pigs) (goita sheep or pig)
 gyllas kind of glass (gyalas a Megarian cup)
 gôps pl. gopes macherel (Attic koloios) (LSJ: skôps a fish) (Modern Greek gopa 'bogue' fish pl. gopes)
 daitas caterer waiter (Attic daitros
 danos 'death', (Hes. Attic thánatos  'death', from root  than-), PIE * 'to leave,  danotês (disaster, pain) Sophocles Lacaenae fr.338
 danōn 'murderer' (Attic  thanōn dead, past participle)
 darullos 'oak' (Hes. Attic  drûs, PIE *)
 drêes or  drêges small birds (Attic strouthoi) (Elean δειρήτης deirêtês, strouthos, Nicander.Fr.123.) (LSJ: διγῆρες digêres strouthoi, δρίξ drix strouthos)
 dôrax spleen, splên (Attic θώραξ thôrax chest, corslet
 epideipnis Macedonian dessert
 Zeirênis epithet or alternative for Aphrodite (Seirênis Siren-like)
 Êmathia ex-name of Macedonia, region of Emathia from mythological Emathus (Homeric amathos êmathoessa, river-sandy land, PIE *. Generally the coastal Lower Macedonia in contrast to mountainous Upper Macedonia. For meadow land (mē-2, m-e-t- to reap), see Pokorny.
 Thaulos epithet or alternative of Ares ( Thaulia 'festival in Doric Tarentum,  thaulizein 'to celebrate like Dorians', Thessalian  Zeus Thaulios, the only attested in epigraphy ten times, Athenian  Zeus Thaulôn, Athenian family  Thaulônidai
 Thourides Nymphs Muses (Homeric thouros rushing, impetuous.
 izela wish, good luck (Attic agathêi tychêi) (Doric bale, abale, Arcadian zele) (Cretan delton agathon) or Thracian zelas wine.
 ílax 'the holm-oak, evergreen or scarlet oak' (Hes. Attic  prînos, Latin ilex)
 in dea midday (Attic endia, mesêmbria) (Arcadian also in instead of Attic en)
 kancharmon having the lance up  (Hes.  ancharmon  Ibyc? Stes?) having upwards the point of a spear)
, Crasis kai and, together, simultaneously + anô up (anôchmon hortatory password
 karabos
Macedonian 'gate, door' (Cf. karphos any small dry body,piece of wood (Hes. Attic 'meat roasted over coals'; Attic karabos 'stag-beetle'; 'crayfish'; 'light ship'; hence modern Greek  karávi)
'the worms in dry wood' (Attic 'stag-beetle, horned beetle; crayfish')
'a sea creature' (Attic 'crayfish, prickly crustacean; stag-beetle')
 karpaia Thessalo-Macedonian mimic military dance (see also Carpaea) Homeric karpalimos swift (for foot) eager, ravenous.
 kíkerroi 'chick-peas'  (Hes. Attic  ōkhroi, PIE * 'pea') (LSJ: kikeros land crocodile)
 kommarai or komarai crawfishes (Attic karides) (LSJ: kammaros a kind of lobster, Epicharmus.60, Sophron.26, Rhinthon.18:-- also kammaris, idos Galen.6.735.) (komaris a fish Epicharmus.47.)
 komboi 'molars' (Attic  gomphioi, dim. of  gomphos 'a large, wedge-shaped bolt or nail; any bond or fastening', PIE *gombh-)
 kynoupes or kynoutos bear (Hesychius kynoupeus, knoupeus, knôpeus) (kunôpês dog-faced) (knôps beast esp. serpent instead of kinôpeton, blind acc. Zonar (from knephas dark) (if kynoutos knôdês knôdalon beast)
 lakedáma  salty water with alix, rice-wheat or fish-sauce.(Cf.skorodalmê 'sauce or pickle composed of brine and garlic'). According to Albrecht von Blumenthal, -ama corresponds to Attic  halmurós 'salty'; Cretan Doric hauma for Attic halmē; laked- is cognate to Proto-Germanic  leek, possibly related is  Laked-aímōn, the name of the Spartan land.
 leíbēthron 'stream' (Hes. Attic  rheîthron, also  libádion, 'a small stream', dim. of  libás; PIE *lei, 'to flow'); typical Greek productive suffix  (-thron) (Macedonian toponym, Pierian Leibethra place/tomb of Orpheus)
 mattuês kind of bird ( mattuê a meat-dessert of Macedonian or Thessalian origin) (verb mattuazo to prepare the mattue) (Athenaeus)
 paraos eagle or kind of eagle (Attic aetos, Pamphylian aibetos) (PIE * 'going, passage' + * 'bird') (Greek para- 'beside' + Hes. aos wind) (It may exist as food in Lopado...pterygon)
 peripeteia or  peritia Macedonian festival in month Peritios. (Hesychius text )
 rhamata bunch of grapes (Ionic rhagmata, rhages Koine rhôgmata, rhôges, rhax rhôx)
 rhouto this (neut.) (Attic  touto)
 tagonaga Macedonian institution, administration (Thessalian  tagos commander + agô lead)

Other sources 
 aigipops eagle (EM 28.19) (error for argipous? maybe goat-eater? aix ,aigos + pepsis digestion) (Cf.eagle chelônophagos turtle-eater)
 argyraspides (wiki Argyraspides) chrysaspides and chalkaspides (golden and bronze-shielded)
 dramis a Macedonian bread (Thessalian bread daratos)(Athamanian bread dramix. (Athenaeus)
 kausia felt hat used by Macedonians, forming part of the regalia of the kings.
 koios number (Athenaeus when talking about Koios, the Titan of intelligence; and the Macedonians use koios as synonymous with arithmos (LSJ: koeô mark, perceive, hear koiazô pledge, Hes. compose s.v. ) (Laocoön, thyoskoos observer of sacrifices, akouô hear) (All from PIE root *keu to notice, observe, feel; to hear).
 pezetairoi (wiki Pezhetairoi), Hetairidia, Macedonian religious festival (Attic ,) (Aeolic )
 Púdna, Pydna toponym (Pokorny Attic  puthmēn 'bottom, sole, base of a vessel'; PIE *; Attic  pýndax 'bottom of vessel') (Cretan,Pytna Hierapytna, Sacred Pytna)
 sigynos spear (Cypriotic sigynon) (Illyrian sibyne) (Origin: Illyrian acc. to Fest.p. 453 L., citing Ennius) (Cyprian acc. to Herodotus and Aristotle Il. cc., Scythian acc. to Sch.Par.A.R.4.320 (cf. 111)
 sphuraina, hammer-fish sphyraena (Strattis, Makedones (fr. 28) – (Attic. κέστρα, kestra) (cestra, needle-fish (modern Greek fish σφυρίδα, sfyrida)
 uetês of the same year Marsyas (Attic autoetês, Poetic oietês)
 charôn lion (Attic/Poetic fierce, for lion, eagle instead of charopos, charops bright-eyed)

Proposed 
A number of Hesychius words are listed orphan; some of them have been proposed as Macedonian

 agerda wild pear-tree (Attic  acherdos).
 adalos charcoal dust (Attic  aithalos,  asbolos)
 addee imp. hurry up  (Attic thee of theô run)
 adis 'hearth' (Hes.  eskhára, LSJ Attic  aîthos 'fire, burning heat')
 aidôssa (Attic aithousa portico, corridor, verandah, a loggia leading from aulê yard to prodomos)
 baskioi 'fasces' (Hes. Attic  desmoì phrūgánōn, Pokorny  baskeutaí, Attic  phaskídes, Attic  pháskōlos 'leather sack', PIE *)
 bix sphinx (Boeotian phix), (Attic sphinx)
 dalancha sea (Attic thalatta) (Ionic thalassa)
 dedalai package, bundle (Attic dethla, desmai)
 eskorodos tenon (Attic tormos  skorthos tornos slice, lathe)
 Eudalagines Graces Χάριτες (Attic  Euthalgines)
 kanadoi 'jaws' nom. pl. (Attic  gnathoi, PIE *, 'jaw') (Laconian  kanadoka notch (V) of an arrow )
 laiba shield (Doric  laia,  laipha) (Attic aspis)
 lalabis storm (Attic lailaps)
 homodalion isoetes plant (θάλλω thallô bloom)
 rhoubotos potion (Attic rhophema) rhopheo suck, absorb rhoibdeô suck with noise.

Macedonian in Classical sources 

Among the references that have been discussed as possibly bearing some witness to the linguistic situation in Macedonia, there is a sentence from a fragmentary dialogue, apparently between an Athenian and a Macedonian, in an extant fragment of the 5th century BC comedy 'Macedonians' by the Athenian poet Strattis (fr. 28), where a stranger is portrayed as speaking in a rural Greek dialect.

Another text that has been quoted as evidence is a passage from Livy (lived 59 BC-14 AD) in his Ab urbe condita (31.29). Describing political negotiations between Macedonians and Aetolians in the late 3rd century BC, Livy has a Macedonian ambassador argue that Aetolians, Acarnanians and Macedonians were "men of the same language". This has been interpreted as referring to a shared North-West Greek speech (as opposed to Attic Koiné). In another passage, Livy states that an announcement was translated from Latin to Greek for Macedonians to understand.

Quintus Curtius Rufus, Philotas's trial and the statement that the Greek-speaking Branchidae had common language with the Macedonians.

Over time, "Macedonian" (μακεδονικός), when referring to language (and related expressions such as μακεδονίζειν; to speak in the Macedonian fashion) acquired the meaning of Koine Greek.

Contributions to the Koine 

As a consequence of the Macedonians' role in the formation of the Koine, Macedonian contributed considerable elements, unsurprisingly including some military terminology (διμοιρίτης, ταξίαρχος, ὑπασπισταί, etc.). Among the many contributions were the general use of the first declension grammar for male and female nouns with an -as ending, attested in the genitive of Macedonian coinage from the early 4th century BC of Amyntas III (ΑΜΥΝΤΑ in the genitive; the Attic form that fell into disuse would be ΑΜΥΝΤΟΥ). There were changes in verb conjugation such as in the Imperative δέξα attested in Macedonian sling stones found in Asiatic battlefields, that became adopted in place of the Attic forms. Koine Greek established a spirantisation of beta, gamma and delta, which has been attributed to the Macedonian influence.

See also 
Amerias
Ancient Greece
Ancient Greek
Ancient Greek dialects
Government of Macedonia (ancient kingdom)
Hellenic languages
History of Macedonia (ancient kingdom)
Macedon
Phrygian language
Proto-Greek language
Thracian language

Notes 

 The Oxford English Dictionary (1989), Macedonian, Simpson J. A. & Weiner E. S. C. (eds), Oxford: Oxford University Press, Vol. IX,  (set)  (vol. IX) p. 153
 Webster's Third New International Dictionary of the English Language Unabridged (1976), Macedonian, USA:Merriam-Webster, G. & C. Merriam Co., vol. II (H–R)

References

Further reading 

 Brixhe, Claude & Anna Panayotou, “Le Macédonien”, Langues indo-européennes, ed. Françoise Bader. Paris: CNRS, 1994, pp 205–220. 
 Chadwick, John, The Prehistory of the Greek Language. Cambridge, 1963.
 Crossland, R. A., “The Language of the Macedonians”, Cambridge Ancient History, vol. 3, part 1, Cambridge 1982.
 Hammond, Nicholas G.L., “Literary Evidence for Macedonian Speech”, Historia: Zeitschrift für Alte Geschichte, Vol. 43, No. 2. (1994), pp. 131–142.
 Hatzopoulos, M. B. “Le Macédonien: Nouvelles données et théories nouvelles”, Ancient Macedonia, Sixth International Symposium, vol. 1. Institute for Balkan Studies, 1999.
 . "Position of the Ancient Macedonian Language and the Name of the Contemporary Makedonski". In: Studia Minora Facultatis Philosophicae Universitatis Brunensis (Brown University), E36 (1991). pp. 129-140. 
 Kalléris, Jean. Les Anciens Macédoniens, étude linguistique et historique. Athens: Institut français d'Athènes, 1988.
 Katičić, Radoslav. Ancient Languages of the Balkans. The Hague—Paris: Mouton, 1976.
 Neroznak, V. Paleo-Balkan languages. Moscow, 1978.
 Rhomiopoulou, Katerina. An Outline of Macedonian History and Art. Greek Ministry of Culture and Science, 1980.
 . "The Etymology and Correlation of the Ancient Macedonian Gloss ‘lakedama’ and Phrygian ‘lakedokey’". In: Živa Antika [Antiquité Vivante] 71 (2021): 19–26. DOI: https://www.doi.org/10.47054/ZIVA21711-2019ch 
Die Makedonen: Ihre Sprache und ihr Volkstum by Otto Hoffmann

External links 
Ancient Macedonian as a Greek dialect: A critical survey on recent work (Greek, English, French, German text)
The speech of the ancient Macedonians, in the light of recent epigraphic discoveries
Jona Lendering, Ancient Macedonia web page on livius.org
Greek Inscriptions from ancient Macedonia (Epigraphical Database)
Heinrich Tischner on Hesychius' words 
www.sil.org: ISO639-3, entry for Ancient Macedonian (XMK)

Hellenic languages
Macedonian language (ancient)l
Language
Macedonian
Varieties of Ancient Greek
Languages attested from the 1st millennium BC
Languages extinct in the 4th century BC